Granite Basin Lake is a reservoir located near Prescott, in Yavapai County, North Central Arizona. It is in the Prescott National Forest, adjacent to the Granite Mountain Wilderness Area.

History
Construction began on the dam in 1937 by the Civilian Conservation Corps, and was completed in 1939.

The Raft, a segment of the movie Creepshow 2, was filmed at the lake.

Fish species
 Largemouth Bass
 Sunfish
 Channel Catfish

References

External links

Arizona Boating Locations Facilities Map
Arizona Fishing Locations Map
Recreational Activities in the Prescott National Forest
Video of Granite Basin Lake

Reservoirs in Yavapai County, Arizona
Prescott National Forest
Dams in Arizona
Dams completed in 1939